Koko Prasetyo Darkuncoro (born October 2, 1981 in Jakarta) is a beach volleyball player from Indonesia. He competed at the 2006 Asian Games, and won a silver medal at the 2002 Asian Games. At the 2008 Asian Beach Games he received a gold medal with partner Andy Ardiyansah.

References

1981 births
Living people
Indonesian beach volleyball players
Men's beach volleyball players
Asian Games medalists in beach volleyball
Asian Games silver medalists for Indonesia
Medalists at the 2002 Asian Games
Beach volleyball players at the 2002 Asian Games
Beach volleyball players at the 2006 Asian Games
Beach volleyball players at the 2010 Asian Games
Beach volleyball players at the 2014 Asian Games
Southeast Asian Games silver medalists for Indonesia
Southeast Asian Games gold medalists for Indonesia
Southeast Asian Games medalists in volleyball
Competitors at the 2005 Southeast Asian Games
Competitors at the 2007 Southeast Asian Games
Competitors at the 2009 Southeast Asian Games
Competitors at the 2011 Southeast Asian Games
21st-century Indonesian people